Der Unsichtbare (German for "The Invisible")  is a 1987 German comedy film starring Klaus Wennemann, Barbara Rudnik and (in a non-singing role) the German popstar Nena.

Plot 

Peter Benjamin (Klaus Wennemann), a successful middle-aged television talk-show host, is bequeathed by his uncle Josef (Rudolf Schündler) a magic cap, whose wearer becomes invisible.  Benjamin decides to surprise his wife Helene (Barbara Rudnik) but instead finds her making a phone call to her lover who, unbeknownst to Benjamin, is his personal assistant Eduard (Benedict Freitag).  Distressed, Benjamin disposes of the cap in a street rubbish bin but, unhinged by his discovery, makes a mess of his TV show that evening in which he pleads his wife to stop doing what she is doing.

Watching the programme, journalist Jo Schnell (Nena), whose boyfriend is cheating on her, senses a hot story.  She pursues Benjamin who is becoming increasingly erratic, trying to work out the identity of his wife's lover.  Helene leaves him, he loses his job and is further hassled by the frantic attention of his mother (Camilla Horn).

Benjamin decides to resolve his problems by retrieving the magic cap, which he finds in a rubbish tip.  Invisible, he returns to his TV studio to harass his boss, whose office he trashes.  Also whilst invisible, he sneaks into Helene's hotel room and pleasures her in bed beside Eduard.  Meanwhile, Jo, from scrutinising photos of Benjamin meeting his mother, deduces the cap's magic qualities.

After leaving Helene's hotel room, Benjamin meets a woman in the lift and takes her back to his apartment, whereupon Jo arrives in search of the cap.  When Helene rings on the doorbell, Benjamin bundles Jo and the woman into a wardrobe where the cap is stored.  Helene has come to collect her possessions but when she opens the wardrobe, there is no sign of Jo or the woman.  In the ensuing confusion Jo (wearing the cap) escapes to catch a train, which she knows her cheating boyfriend and his new girlfriend will be travelling on.

Helene and Benjamin figure out where Jo has gone and catch the same train where Jo, invisible, is taunting her boyfriend and his new girlfriend.  Meanwhile, Benjamin mistakes a passenger's cap for the magic one, steels it and causes a scene thinking he is invisible. Train staff confine him to a compartment where he is rescued by Jo.  Jo and Benjamin start kissing and cuddling before being discovered by Helene.  Having left the train, the three of them discuss the future.  The film ends three months later with the main characters using the cap to further their own ends - Benjamin  to resurrect his TV career as a magician and Helene to steal expensive jewellery.

Background 
Der Unsichtbare was filmed in July and August 1986 in Munich and Vienna and was premiered on 8 October 1987.  It was first broadcast on television by RTLplus on 23 May 1991.  It was director Ulf Miehe's last film and his first for 12 years and also the first film for 17 years for actress Camilla Horn, a star since the silent film era.
Supporting actors Benedict Freitag and Nena met during filming and started a relationship which lasted 7 years and produced 3 children.  Speaking several years after the end of their relationship, Freitag described meeting Nena as, “love at second sight,” and being attracted to her, “whole being...her spirit, humour…and the spark she has fascinates me.”

Reception 
Der Unsichtbare received generally negative reviews.

Writing a week after Der Unsichtbare’s release, film critic Michael Althen describes the idea of an invisibility cloak as “old hat” which Hollywood had made “threadbare”.  Consequently, the film's director Miehe, “lands not only on the visible but the predictable, thereby putting a fool’s cap on the film.”

Cinema magazine wrote, "Director Ulf Miehe has done it: Beyond the nonsense and slapstick humour of Otto, Didi, Krüger, Gottschalk and Co., he has succeeded with the comedy film “Der Unsichtbare” in achieving higher levels of humour and managing to provoke everything from smirking to doubling up with laughter."

The German film database Zweitausendeins describes, "A turbulent comedy in which the quality of the screenplay and the solid work of the actors are hampered by the partially clumsy staging.  The film is constantly appealing as, beyond all expectations, comes an ironic play on ways of seeing and thinking."

Der Unsichtbare was not a commercial success, failing to finish in the Top 100 films in Germany in 1987.  The film was shown at the Munich film festival that year, one reviewer of its showing describing it as a “work of ignorance”. It has also been suggested that the film's lack of success was a prime reason for one of its leading actors, Barbara Rudnik, focussing on her TV career.

Nevertheless, in 1988 Miehe and Klaus Richter were awarded the Bavarian Film Prize for best screenplay for Der Unsichtbare and Milan Bor the award for best sound for 4 films including Der Unsichtbare.

References

External links 
 

1987 films
1980s fantasy comedy films
German fantasy comedy films
West German films
Films about invisibility
1987 comedy films
1980s German-language films
1980s German films